Christian Scott Davidson (born 20 November 1989) is a Scottish footballer.

Career
Davidson played college soccer at University of North Carolina Wilmington between 2008 and 2011.

Davidson signed his first professional contract with USL Professional Division club Wilmington Hammerheads on 2 April 2012.

References

External links
 UNCW profile

1989 births
Living people
Scottish footballers
Scottish expatriate footballers
UNC Wilmington Seahawks men's soccer players
Indiana Invaders players
Wilmington Hammerheads FC players
Expatriate soccer players in the United States
USL League Two players
Association football defenders
USL Championship players
Scottish expatriate sportspeople in the United States